is a Japanese actress and voice actress. Her best known roles include the Futami twins in The Idolmaster, and Kagamine Rin and Len in the Vocaloid Crypton Future Media's Character Vocal Series. In the adult game Tayutama, she used the name Kaori Hanano. Asami is also a singer. She released her first mini album in 2010. Two years later, she released "Awake", her debut maxi single, which was released under 5pb. records.

Filmography

Television animation
2008
Kyō no Go no Ni, Chika Koizumi

2009
Tayutama: Kiss on my Deity, Ameri Kawai

2010
B Gata H Kei, Chika Yamada
Seitokai Yakuindomo, Kotomi Tsuda

2011
Infinite Stratos, Huang Lingyin
Nekogami Yaoyorozu, Hasumi Shirasaki
The IDOLM@STER, Ami Futami and Mami Futami

2012
Cardfight!! Vanguard: Asia Circuit Hen, Lee Shenlon
Good Luck Girl!, Ryūta Tsuwabuki
Oniai, Haruomi Ginbei Sawatari

2013
Cuticle Tantei Inaba, Yūta Sasaki
Infinite Stratos 2, Huang Lingyin
Ro-Kyu-Bu! SS, Nana Yotsuya
Shingeki no Kyojin, Nanaba

2014
Dragonar Academy, Anya
Futsū no Joshikōsei ga Locodol Yattemita, Saori Nishifukai
Momo Kyun Sword, Kushinoda
Seitokai Yakuindomo, Kotomi Tsuda

2016
Kiss Him, Not Me, Amane Nakano

2017
Shingeki no Kyojin Season 2, Nanaba

Original video animation (OVA)
The Idolmaster Live For You! (2008), Ami Futami and Mami Futami
Aika Zero (2009), Kana Shiraishi

Original net animation (ONA)
Puchimas! Petit Idolmaster (2013), Ami and Mami Futami, and Koami and Komami

Films
Book Girl (2010), Kurara Mori

Video games

Black Rock Shooter The Game, Nafhe
Do-Don-Pachi SaiDaiOuJou, Operator
GetAmped2, Dolores
Killer Is Dead, Alice
Cosmic Break, various characters
The Idolm@ster series, Ami and Mami Futami
Princess Connect Re:Dive Matsuri Orihara (Matsuri)
Fairy Fencer F, Pipin
Super Heroine Chronicle (2014), Huang Lingyin
Infinite Stratos: Archetype Breaker (2017), Huang Lingyin
Azur Lane (2017), Universal Bulin, Trial Bulin MKII, Specialized Bulin Custom MKIII
Arknights (2019), Lancet-2, Vigna
 Higurashi When They Cry video games (2007-2015), - Madoka MinaiGirls' Frontline'' (2022) Fo-12

Discography

Albums
 December 22, 2010: Dreams
 February 27, 2012: Fan appreciation CD link

Singles
 June 27, 2012: Awake

References

External links
  
 

Living people
Arts Vision voice actors
Japanese video game actresses
Japanese voice actresses
Musicians from Tottori Prefecture
Vocaloid voice providers
Voice actors from Tottori Prefecture
Voice actresses from Tottori Prefecture
21st-century Japanese actresses
21st-century Japanese women singers
21st-century Japanese singers
Year of birth missing (living people)